Zaytsevo is a rural locality (a selo) in Pevomaysky Selsoviet, Yanaulsky District, Bashkortostan, Russia. The population was 315 as of 2010. There are 7 streets.

Geography 
Zaytsevo is located 20 km south of Yanaul (the district's administrative centre) by road. Cheraul is the nearest rural locality.

References 

Rural localities in Yanaulsky District